ZNS (Zephyr Nassau Sunshine) is a national television broadcaster operated by the state-owned Broadcasting Corporation of The Bahamas (BCB). ZNS-TV's two transmitters, serving Nassau and Freeport, are the only over-the-air TV stations in the country. The rest of the country receives these channels (and a privately owned station) via Cable Bahamas, a privately held company that maintained an exclusive licence to operate cable TV services until 2009.

BCB also owns ZNS-1 AM Radio 1540 (a clear-channel station), its repeater, ZNS-1 on 104.5, ZNS-2 AM 1240, 107.9 "Inspiration 107.9 FM" in Nassau, and ZNS-3 AM 810 / FM 104.5 "Power 104.5" in Freeport.

History

ZNS radio was founded in 1937 to broadcast hurricane warnings to the islands throughout the archipelago. At its inception, the station broadcast for two hours a day, featuring news and musical recordings from the BBC and Nassau sources. The radio station eventually established another transmitter in Freeport on the island of Grand Bahama.

ZNS-TV launched in Nassau on New Providence Island in 1977. The station aired programming to entertain, educate and inform. It aired sitcoms, sports, dramas, and even movies. In 1992, the stations started to air only public affairs programming.

In October 2010, the BCB implemented a major restructuring exercise in which approximately 80 employees were made redundant. This event sparked much public debate. The government offered a severance package to employees who separated from the company. One reason for restructuring was that the previous governments had declared the BCB to be a major strain on the public purse, bringing in little revenue. The further reason for the downsizing was to enable the corporation's transition to a public broadcasting service.

The people behind the changes were then Minister of National Security with Responsibilities for Broadcasting, Hon. Tommy Turnquest, and the chairman of BCB, Michael Moss, along with his board and managers. Payouts were reported to cost the government around $4 million. Many of those who received separation packages and termination letters generally were unhappy, because it did not reflect their years of service. However, the government maintained that the separation package was generous, considering the economic climate in the country and that they were greater than required by law. In addition to the monetary payouts, those affected were provided with health insurance for 12 months.

On 14 December 2011, ZNS-TV announced that it was planning on converting to ATSC digital terrestrial television, with the additional capability of adding a mobile DTV feed.

In 2017, ZNS-TV shut down its on-channel repeater in Freeport, ZNS-TV-1 (also using VHF 13), and substantially reduced power at its remaining transmitter in Nassau.

See also
Television in the Bahamas
List of the Caribbean television channels

References

External links
Official website

Television stations in the Bahamas
Publicly funded broadcasters
State media
Television channels and stations established in 1977
1977 establishments in the Bahamas